Ajay Singh (born 17 April 1997) is an Indian weightlifter who competes in the 81 kg weight class. He is a two-time Commonwealth Championships gold medalist. Singh lifted a total of 322 kg and also set a national record in Snatch round of 146 kg in 2021 Tashkent.

References

External links

Living people
1997 births
Indian male weightlifters
Weightlifters from Rajasthan
Weightlifters at the 2022 Commonwealth Games
Commonwealth Games competitors for India
20th-century Indian people
21st-century Indian people